2685 Masursky, provisional designation , is a stony Eunomian asteroid from the central regions of the asteroid belt, approximately  in diameter. It was discovered on 3 May 1981, by American astronomer Edward Bowell at the Anderson Mesa Station near Flagstaff, Arizona, and named after American planetary geologist Harold Masursky. In January 2000, the Cassini space probe observed the S-type asteroid from afar during its coast to Saturn.

Orbit and classification 

Masursky is a member of the Eunomia family, a prominent family of stony asteroids and the largest one in the intermediate main belt with more than 5,000 members.

It orbits the Sun in the central main-belt at a distance of 2.3–2.9 AU once every 4 years and 1 month (1,505 days; semi-major axis of 2.57 AU). Its orbit has an eccentricity of 0.11 and an inclination of 12° with respect to the ecliptic.

Cassini–Huygens flyby 

Little was known about Masursky until the Cassini–Huygens space probe, en route to Jupiter and Saturn, flew past it on 23 January 2000. Because Cassini passed the asteroid at a distance of 1.6 million kilometers (approximately 4 lunar distances), the images it returned showed nothing more than a dot.

Physical characteristics 

Cassini's observations had cast some doubt on its composition, but later ground-based spectroscopy has confirmed its stony S-type spectrum, which is also the Eunomia family's overall spectral type.

Diameter and albedo 

During its flyby in January 2000, Cassini–Huygens estimated a mean-diameter of approximately 15–20 kilometers, based on an angular diameter of 0.81–1.08 arcseconds just hours before its closest approach. According to the survey carried out by the NEOWISE mission of NASA's Wide-field Infrared Survey Explorer, Masursky measures 10.744 kilometers in diameter and its surface has an albedo of 0.114.

Rotation period 

As of 2018, no rotational lightcurve of Masursky has been obtained from photometric observations. The body's rotation period, spin-axis and shape remain unknown.

Naming 

This minor planet was named after Harold Masursky (1923–1990), a planetary geologist at the USGS Astrogeology Science Center of the U.S. Geological Survey, in Flagstaff, Arizona. Masursky worked on numerous space missions and programs including Ranger, Surveyor, Lunar Orbiter, Apollo, Mariner 9, Viking, Pioneer Venus, Voyager, as well as on the Galileo and Magellan spacecraft. The official naming citation was published by the Minor Planet Center on 4 August 1982.

References

External links 
 New Cassini Images of Asteroid Available, 11 Feb 2000
 Asteroid Lightcurve Database (LCDB), query form (info )
 Dictionary of Minor Planet Names, Google books
 Discovery Circumstances: Numbered Minor Planets (1)-(5000) – Minor Planet Center
 
 

002685
Discoveries by Edward L. G. Bowell
Named minor planets
002685
20000123
19810503